Pyar Hi Pyar Mein (Urdu: پیار ہی پیار میں) is a 2003 Pakistani film directed by Fahim Burney. The film generated considerable hype prior to its release but was a commercial failure.

Plot
Sara (Anchal) and Ashal (Ashal) are partners in the academy who are in love. Ashal dreams of becoming rich before getting married and encounters someone who can make his dreams a reality, Nisha.

Nisha, enamored by Ashal, sweeps him off to Dubai to establish a branch of the academy. Ashal becomes involved with her, and Nisha creates hurdles to make Sara marry a business tycoon, Akhter. 

Ashal spots Sara dancing at a nightclub. After a couple of dance sequences, Ashal discovers that the woman he has been pursuing is not Sara but her twin sister Anchal. He discovers she has a fiance, Sameer. 

To reunite with her mother and sister, Ashal brings Anchal and her fiance to Pakistan and discovers Sara has become a widow. She gives birth to a son. Her stepmother-in-law arranges for her to be kidnapped to coerce her to marry her younger son and keep the family's wealth.

Cast
 Ali Tabish
 Anchal
 Nisha
 Meera 
 Wasif Butt

Accolades

Soundtrack

External links
 

2003 films
Pakistani romantic drama films
2000s Urdu-language films
Films scored by Wajid Nashad
Urdu-language Pakistani films